The Third Ponta Cabinet was the executive of Romania from 5 March to 13 December 2014. It was established after one day before it received the vote of confidence from the country's Parliament. The Third Ponta Cabinet is supported by PSD–UNPR–PC Alliance and an unregistered party (PLR) led by Călin Popescu-Tăriceanu. In December 2014, UDMR voted the egress from the government, invoking the result of the presidential election, inasmuch as Klaus Iohannis, PSD counter candidate, was voted by more than 70% of the electorate in the ethnic Hungarian counties.

History 
The Third Ponta Cabinet was approved by the Romanian Parliament on 4 March 2014 and took the oath in the presence of President Traian Băsescu on the evening of 5 March 2014.

Controversies 
Liberal Democratic Party and People's Movement Party, members of the opposition, submitted to the Constitutional Court of Romania a contestation against the government investiture, arguing that the government can't be invested without a political program. Even the President has repeatedly stated that he won't invest the government if it won't adopt as soon as a new political program. The Ponta Government announced the engagement of liability in Parliament for a new program, and therefore the Constitutional Court found, with 8 votes for and 1 against, that the contestation is redundant.

Composition

References 

Ponta III
2014 establishments in Romania
2014 disestablishments in Romania
Cabinets established in 2014
Cabinets disestablished in 2014